Frank Durward White (born Durward Frank Kyle Jr.; June 4, 1933 – May 21, 2003) was an American banker and politician who served as the 41st governor of Arkansas. He served a single two-year term from 1981 to 1983.

Early years, family, education
White was born on June 4, 1933, in Texarkana in Bowie County, Texas, as Durward Frank Kyle Jr. His father, Durward Frank Kyle, died when White was seven, and White's mother, the former Ida Bottoms Clark, married Loftin E. White of Highland Park, Texas. He took his stepfather's name and became "Frank Durward White". After the death of the stepfather in 1950, the Whites returned to Texarkana. One of his first missions in the Air Force, in 1957, was to fly members of the 101st Airborne Division from Kentucky to Little Rock in the Little Rock Integration Crisis. White was discharged from the Air Force in 1961 with the rank of Captain.

Business career
During this time, White would serve as the first director of the Little Rock Port Authority from 1972 to 1973.

Campaign 1980

Early in 1980, White switched from Democratic to Republican affiliation to run for governor. First, he defeated former State Representative Marshall Chrisman, a businessman from Ozark in Franklin County, for the gubernatorial nomination. In a low-turnout open primary, White polled 5,867 votes (71.8 percent) to Chrisman's 2,310 (28.2 percent). Clinton also faced a stronger-than-expected challenger in his primary from Monroe Schwarzlose, a turkey farmer from Kingsland in Cleveland County in south Arkansas. Schwarzlose's 31 percent of the primary vote foreshadowed that Clinton could be in trouble for the upcoming general election. Despite this, it was widely expected that Clinton would win the election.

White hired Paula Unruh of Tulsa to manage the campaign. She decided to focus upon (1) Clinton's unpopular increase in the cost of automobile registration tags and by (2) the Carter administration's sending thousands of Cuban refugees, some unruly, to a detention camp at Fort Chaffee, outside Fort Smith in Sebastian County in western Arkansas. Her decision paid big dividends, as White won with 435,684 votes (51.9 percent) to Clinton's 403,242 (48.1 percent). White won fifty-one of the state's seventy-five counties. A. Lynn Lowe of Texarkana, Clinton's Republican opponent in 1978, by contrast, had won only six counties.

White was the second Republican ever elected governor in Arkansas since Reconstruction.

Two years as governor
White signed a law which required the teaching of creationism in Arkansas public schools, along with the theory of evolution. The law was subsequently overturned in 1982 in the court case McLean v. Arkansas.

White also created a controversy within his own party in 1981, when he appointed Orval Faubus, a former Democratic governor, to head the Arkansas Department of Veterans Affairs.

Re-election loss and later career

White was unable to secure a hold on the governorship. Chrisman and a third candidate, nutritionist Connie Voll of Lonoke, challenged him  in the 1982 primary. Voll was the first woman to seek the GOP nomination for governor and the second to seek the party nomination for a statewide office since Leona Troxell. Clinton then defeated him in a rematch of the 1980 contest during the general election: 431,855 (54.7 percent) to 357,496 (45.3 percent). White won only nineteen counties in the 1982 rematch, which occurred in a nationally Democratic year when the nation was in a recession.

White's loss in this election dramatically damaged his political image, making it very unlikely that he could win the governorship again.

He returned to First Commercial Bank in Little Rock after his 1986 defeat as senior vice president until his retirement from the bank in 1998. White declined to seek the Republican nomination for governor again in 1990 and instead supported Sheffield Nelson in his primary race against U.S. Representative Tommy F. Robinson. That year, Clinton won election as governor for the fifth time; two years later he would become President of the United States. Without sufficient support and resources to run for elected office again, White left elective politics but remained active in Republican affairs.

State banking commissioner and death
From 1998 to 2003, White served as Arkansas Banking Commissioner, an appointment from Governor Mike Huckabee. He remained in the post until shortly before his death from a heart attack in 2003, about two weeks before his seventieth birthday. White's time in the Banking Department was noted by his practice of visiting all of Arkansas' state-chartered banks at least once a year.

White is interred at the historic Mount Holly Cemetery in Little Rock.

The Arkansas Republican Party began hosting the " 'Hi, I'm Frank White' Awards Dinner" in 2006. This award is considered to be the highest honor given out by the Arkansas GOP.

See also
 List of governors of Arkansas

References

External links
 Encyclopedia of Arkansas History & Culture entry: Frank White
 Finding Aid, Frank White Papers, UA Little Rock Center for Arkansas History and Culture

Further reading
 Arkansas Gazette, August 5, November 13, 22, 1981; October 29, December 5, 1982.
 Who's Who in the South and Southwest, 18th edition (1982–1983), p. 803.
 Arkansas Election Statistics, 1980 and 1982 (Little Rock: Secretary of State).
 Shreveport Times, January 7, 1982.

1933 births
2003 deaths
American bankers
Burials at Mount Holly Cemetery
Businesspeople from Little Rock, Arkansas
Arkansas Democrats
Arkansas Republicans
American stockbrokers
Governors of Arkansas
Merrill (company) people
Politicians from Little Rock, Arkansas
People from Texarkana, Texas
Texas A&M University alumni
Republican Party governors of Arkansas
United States Air Force officers
United States Naval Academy alumni
Former Methodists
American evangelicals
American United Methodists
Former Baptists